The Pundir (also spelled Pandeer, Pandir, Pundhir, Pundeer or Poondir) is a Suryavanshi clan of Rajputs based in Uttarakhand and Western Uttar Pradesh, one of the thirty six royal Rajput clans. The word itself is derived from the Sanskrit word "Purandara" (पुरन्दर) literally meaning "the destroyer of enemy" or "the destroyer of cities". The Pundir Rajputs hold riyasat in Nahan, Garhwal, Nagaur and Saharanpur where their Kuldevis are situated. Their shakha is Koolwal and their Kuldevis are Shakumbhri Devi Saharanpur and Dhadimati Mata in Saharanpur and Rajasthan along with Punyakshini Devi in Garhwal. They belong to Pulastya gotra. Most of the Pundirs are today based mainly around the North Indian states of Rajasthan, Uttar Pradesh, Haryana and Uttarakhand.

Origin 
The Pundir clan has its origins from Raja Pundarik, the fourth king in line after Kusha. Pundarik is revered as a Rishi and his temple is situated in Katheugi village of the Kullu district in the state of Himachal Pradesh. The Rishi is depicted as a white Nāga, and in the Puranic lore Pundarik is the name of a White Naga. Kusha, the first born of Sita and Ram, is said to have been the progenitor of the Pundirs.

Martial history 
Pundirs were the most powerful military vassals of the Prithviraj Chauhan Empire of Delhi after the 10th century. Chandra Pundir, the ruler of Haridwar, was a great feudatory of Emperor Prithviraj Chauhan. Chandra Pundir, his son, Dhir Singh Pundir, and grandson, Pavas Pundir sacrificed in the struggle with the Turks. After the defeat of Prithviraj Chauhan in the second battle of Tarain in AD 1192, the rule of the Turks was established in the country. Even so, the Pundir state remained in Haridwar for two centuries.

Eric Stokes noted that

Distribution 
The author Vidya Prakash Tyagi writes, according to information he attributes to another writer, Elliot

References

Further reading
Dadhimati Mata Temple
Evatt, John T. Historical Record of the Royal Garhwal Rifles  (p. 78; p. 103)
Roy, K. The Construction of Regiments in the Indian Army: 1859-1913. War in History, 1 April 2001, vol. 8, no. 2  (pp. 127–148)
Bajpai, Shiv Chandra. The Northern Frontier of India: Central and Western Sector  (p. 23)
Siddiqi, Jamal Muhammad. A Historical Survey: Ancient Times to 1803 AD  (p. 124; p. 180)

Rajput clans
Rajput clans of Uttar Pradesh
Rajput clans of Uttarakhand